The Grand Prix Drivers' Association (GPDA) is the trade union of Formula One drivers.

History
The GPDA was founded in May 1961 and, following an election by members, its inaugural Chairman was Stirling Moss.

Its initial aims of this organisation were to obtain representation on the Commission Sportive Internationale (CSI) of the Fédération Internationale de l'Automobile (FIA), which at the time was motorsport's governing body, in order to improve safety standards and provisions for both drivers and spectators. After Moss retired from the sport in 1963, Jo Bonnier succeeded him.

The organisation was disbanded following the events during the 1982 South African Grand Prix due to the sport's changing commercial arrangements, the Fédération Internationale du Sport Automobile (FISA) adding restrictive clauses to the FIA Super Licence, and the conflict between the Formula One Constructors Association (FOCA) and FIA. It was replaced by the Professional Racing Drivers Association (PRDA) at a drivers' meeting in Paris before the planned-then-cancelled Argentine Grand Prix.

Niki Lauda, Christian Fittipaldi, Michael Schumacher and Gerhard Berger re-established the GPDA over the 1994 Monaco Grand Prix race weekend, following the events of the preceding San Marino Grand Prix, which culminated with the deaths of Ayrton Senna and Roland Ratzenberger, during the Sunday race and Saturday qualifying respectively. Shortly before his own fatal accident, and following the fatal accident of Ratzenberger and the serious accident of Rubens Barrichello during Thursday practice, Senna spent his final morning on the Sunday talking to former teammate and rival Alain Prost to discuss the re-establishment of the GPDA and had offered to take the Chairman role starting from the Monaco Grand Prix.

In 1996, the association was incorporated in the UK as a company limited by guarantee ("Grand Prix Drivers Association Ltd"). For the first time, the association had a formal constitution, and permanent offices in Monaco.

Membership and leadership
Membership of GPDA is not compulsory. For example, during the 2013 Formula One season, only 19 out of 22 active drivers were members (with Kimi Räikkönen, Adrian Sutil and Valtteri Bottas being the exceptions). Joining the GPDA costs £2,000. It was announced on 13 December 2017 that all the drivers had signed up.

GPDA members elect their representatives. Currently, there are four directors: active Formula One driver George Russell, legal adviser Anastasia Fowle (the first non-F1 driver past or present to be appointed a GPDA director)  and former Formula One drivers Sebastian Vettel and Alexander Wurz, the latter of whom serves as chairman.

List of directors
Note: from 1996

Controversies
During the 2005 season the GPDA became increasingly involved in the politics (and controversy) of Formula One.

Significantly, though the majority of drivers signed the statement, Michael Schumacher did not. He claimed that he was not asked to and would not have done so, in any event. The statement claimed that the FIA's proposed solutions to the problems experienced by the Michelin teams were unworkable. Schumacher claimed the problems at Indianapolis were technical rather than a safety issue.

Mosley claimed Coulthard's statements to the media were a "distortion" of the purpose of the meeting and accused him of stirring up dissent. In retaliation the GPDA released a letter that had been sent to Mosley accusing him of jeopardising the GPDA's drive for improved safety:
''“We were also concerned to learn that during the course of [a telephone conversation with Coulthard], you suggested the FIA might withdraw support for the ongoing safety initiatives of the GPDA... The GPDA believes that safety issues are of the highest importance and are disappointed not to receive the full support of the FIA president in this matter".

In 2010, upon his return to the sport as a competitor, Michael Schumacher announced that he did not intend to join the GPDA. He subsequently became a "silent member" following discussions with GPDA directors (chiefly, Felipe Massa).

Notable activities
Thanks to the activism of the GPDA, the Circuit de Spa-Francorchamps was boycotted in 1969 and the Nürburgring in 1970 and after 1976, over safety concerns.

In 2013, following a series of tyre blowouts at the British Grand Prix, tyre safety became a major issue, with the GPDA announcing through a statement that its member drivers would withdraw from the subsequent German Grand Prix unless remedial action was taken.

In May 2015, the GPDA and Motorsport.com joined forces to allow followers of the FIA Formula 1 World Championship to voice and share their opinions about the sport through an extensive worldwide survey for fans. More than 200,000 respondents participated in the survey.

In July 2015, following the death of Jules Bianchi, the GPDA announced that it felt a responsibility "to never relent in improving safety".

In March 2016, following changes to the qualifying system, the GPDA released an open letter written by Jenson Button, Sebastian Vettel and Alexander Wurz on behalf of all drivers saying that the sport's leadership was broken, calling the decision making within Formula One 'obsolete' and 'Ill-structured'.
The GPDA believes that the decision making could 'jeopardise F1's future success'.

After the second free practice session of the 2022 Saudi Arabian Grand Prix, the GPDA held a four hour meeting after multiple instances of missile strikes, some as close as 10km from the circuit. Pierre Gasly spoke to media later, telling them that "Everyone was able to give their opinion. We were aligned with our intentions." A later statement from the FIA and Formula 1 assured that racing will go ahead and that the track is safe. GPDA chairman Alexander Wurz also issued a statement.

See also

Jackie Stewart
Sid Watkins
Road safety

References

External links
Hamilton stance on union 'wrong' BBC 18 March 2008

Formula One
1961 establishments in Europe
1982 disestablishments in Europe
1994 establishments in Europe
Trade unions established in 1961
Trade unions disestablished in 1982
Trade unions established in 1994
Re-established companies